William D. Lutz (born December 12, 1940) is an American linguist who specializes in the use of plain language and the avoidance of doublespeak (deceptive language). He wrote a famous essay The World of Doublespeak on this subject as well as the book Doublespeak  His original essay and the book described the four different types of doublespeak (euphemism, jargon, gobbledygook, and inflated language) and the social dangers of doublespeak.

Biography
In 1962, Lutz received his bachelor's degree from the Dominican College of Racine (which closed its doors in 1974). He received his master's degree in English from Marquette University in 1963 and his doctorate in 1971 from the University of Nevada, Reno. Lutz began teaching English at Rutgers University-Camden in 1971, and was made a full professor in 1991. He retired from teaching in 2006.

From 1980 to 1994, Lutz edited the now defunct Quarterly Review of Doublespeak. He worked as a consultant with a number of corporations and the United States government to promote the use of 'plain language'. For example, he was a significant contributor to the SEC's Plain English Handbook.

Selected publications
 
 (1974) The Age of Communication
 (1989) Doublespeak: From "Revenue Enhancement" to "Terminal Living"  
 (1994) The Cambridge Thesaurus of American English
 (1996) The New Doublespeak: Why No One Knows What Anyone's Saying Anymore
 (1999) Doublespeak Defined: Cut Through the Bull**** and Get the Point

References

Further reading
 (1978) Contemporary Authors: A bio-bibliographical guide to current writers in fiction, general nonfiction, poetry, journalism, drama, motion pictures, television, and other fields volumes 33–36, 1st revision, Gale Research, Detroit,

External links
Business Doublespeak A short essay on Doublespeak by Willian Lutz.

"SEC seeks to "blow up" forms-based system" IR Web Report 25 June 2008 has photograph of William D. Lutz, as "Bill Lutz", accessed 22 December 2008

Rutgers University faculty
Academics from Wisconsin
Writers from Racine, Wisconsin
Dominican College of Racine alumni
University of Nevada alumni
Marquette University alumni
1940 births
Living people